Hassan Al Mulla (born 1951 in Doha, Qatar) is a Qatari artist specializing in paintings. He has been described as a "pioneer in painting in Qatar".

Early life and education
Al Mulla was born in Qatar's capital city Doha in 1951. He had been painting since his childhood. He joined the University of Baghdad's College of Fine Arts in 1972, specializing in oil paintings. In 1975, he graduated with a BA in fine arts.

Career
His paintings are surrealist. The most common themes in his paintings are childhood memories, traditional Qatari activities and the natural environment.

Al Mulla has participated in various regional and international art exhibitions. He participated in all of the Qatar Fine Arts' Society's exhibitions until 1995. His first solo exhibition was held in 1988. In 2013, he held his sixth solo exhibition.

He was one of the eighteen founding members of the Qatari Fine Arts Society in 1980 and served as its second president. He is a former director of the Department of Culture and Arts. He taught painting at Qatar University. In 2011, he was the vice-president of the Qatar Society for Rehabilitation of People with Special Needs.

References

1951 births
Qatari painters
Living people
Qatari contemporary artists
Academic staff of Qatar University
People from Doha